Beranuy, in Catalan and Aragonese: Beranui is a municipality located in the Ribagorza (comarca) comarca, province of Huesca, Aragon, Spain. According to the 2010 census (INE), the municipality has a population of 104 inhabitants.

The municipality was created in 1966 with the union of municipalities of Beranui and Calvera, in a concentration process in the State.

Since 2011 the official name of the municipality is Beranuy, which is an adaptation of Catalan name (Beranui)() in Spanish. In 1966 the municipality received the name of "Veracruz". The paronym Veracruz  is a Hispanicization too of the traditional name Beranui, that disregarded the natural linguistic correspondence.

The 9th - 11th century monastery of Santa María de Obarra is located within the municipal term at the foot of the Mountains of Sis.

Villages
The following villages within the municipal term of Beranuy
Ballabriga
Biascas de Obarra
Calbera
Les Ferreries de Calvera
Morens
Santa María de Obarra
Pardinella

Uninhabited villages
Formons
Ralui

Gallery

See also
Isábena River
El Turbón

References

External links 

 CAI Aragon
 Propostes toponímiques per als nuclis de població de la Franja 

Ribagorza